Countess of Kent is a title that may be held by a female in her own right or given to the wife of the Earl of Kent. Those who have held the title include:

Countesses of Kent in their own right
Joan of Kent (1328-1385), daughter of Edmund of Woodstock, 1st Earl of Kent, and mother of King Richard II of England

Countesses of Kent by marriage
Gytha Thorkelsdóttir (c.997–c.1069), wife of Godwin, Earl of Wessex
Margaret of Scotland, Countess of Kent (1193–1259), wife of Hubert de Burgh, 1st Earl of Kent
Margaret Wake, 3rd Baroness Wake of Liddell (c.1297-1349), wife of Edmund of Woodstock and mother of Joan of Kent
Alice FitzAlan, Countess of Kent (c.1350-1416), wife of Thomas Holland, 2nd Earl of Kent
Lucia Visconti (1372-1424), wife of Edmund Holland, 4th Earl of Kent
Joan de Fauconberg, 6th Baroness Fauconberg (1406-1490), wife of William Neville, 1st Earl of Kent
Lady Katherine Percy (1423–c.1475), wife of Edmund Grey, 1st Earl of Kent
Anne Woodville (c.1438-1489), wife of George Grey, 2nd Earl of Kent
Susan Bertie, Countess of Kent (1554-c.1596), wife of Reginald Grey, 5th Earl of Kent
Elizabeth Grey, Countess of Kent (1582-1651), wife of Henry Grey, 8th Earl of Kent
Mary Grey, Countess of Kent (died 1702), wife of Anthony Grey, 11th Earl of Kent
Grand Duchess Maria Alexandrovna of Russia (1853-1920), wife of Alfred, Duke of Saxe-Coburg and Gotha